Christopher John Ingham CMG (born 4 June 1944) is a retired British Diplomat.

Educated at St John's College, Cambridge, Ingham first joined Cadbury Brothers in 1966 before joining the Diplomatic Service in 1968. After postings in Moscow (1972-1974), Kolkata (1974), Kuwait (1974-1976), Vienna (IAEA/UNIDO) (1980-1985), and Mexico City (1986-1989), as well as time in the Office in London, Ingham was appointed as deputy Head of Mission and Chargé d'Affaires in Bucharest from 1991 to 1995. After then serving as a Counsellor in Madrid, Ingham's last posting was Her Majesty's Ambassador to Uzbekistan and concurrently as (non-resident) Ambassador to Tajikistan in 1999, retiring in 2002.

Ingham was invested as a Companion of the Order of St Michael and St George (CMG) in 2002 in a special Honours list for individuals involved in the early stages of the War in Afghanistan.

Offices held

References 

1944 births
20th-century British diplomats
Living people
Members of HM Diplomatic Service
Companions of the Order of St Michael and St George
Alumni of St John's College, Cambridge
Ambassadors of the United Kingdom to Uzbekistan
Ambassadors of the United Kingdom to Tajikistan